Rodrigo Alfonso de León (1214-1268) was a Spanish nobleman, Lord of Alexer. and Adelantado of León.

Biography 

Rodrigo was the illegitimate son of Alfonso IX of Leon  and his mistress Aldonza Martínez de Silva. His wife was Inés Rodríguez de Cabrera.

References 

1200s births
1268 deaths
13th-century Castilian nobility
Sons of kings